Philipp Wende (born 4 July 1985, in Wurzen) is a German rower. He was part of the German crew that won the gold medal in the men's quadruple sculls at the 2012 Summer Olympics in London.  He also successfully defended the quadruple sculls title at the 2016 Rio Olympics as part of the German team.

References

External links
 

1985 births
Living people
German male rowers
Rowers at the 2012 Summer Olympics
Rowers at the 2016 Summer Olympics
Olympic rowers of Germany
Olympic gold medalists for Germany
Olympic medalists in rowing
Medalists at the 2012 Summer Olympics
Medalists at the 2016 Summer Olympics
People from Wurzen
World Rowing Championships medalists for Germany
European Rowing Championships medalists
Sportspeople from Saxony
21st-century German people